The Roman Catholic Diocese of San José in California is an ecclesiastical territory or diocese of the Roman Catholic Church in the northern California region of the United States. It comprises Santa Clara County, and is led by a bishop. Its patron saints are Saint Joseph and Saint Clare of Assisi. The diocese is a suffragan of the Archdiocese of San Francisco. Its fellow suffragans include the Dioceses of Honolulu, Las Vegas, Oakland, Reno, Sacramento, Salt Lake City, Santa Rosa and Stockton.

The Cathedral Basilica of St. Joseph in Downtown San Jose is the cathedral church of the diocese. The diocesan offices are located at 1150 North First Street. The diocese serves approximately 600,000 Catholics in 54 parishes and missions, three university campus ministries, and 34 schools.

History

The Roman Catholic Church in present-day Santa Clara County dates to the founding of Mission Santa Clara de Asís (a Spanish mission) in 1777, during the era of the Provincias Internas of New Spain. Originally a part of the Diocese of Sonora in Mexico, in 1840 San Jose and the rest of the Californias became part of the Diocese of Alta and Baja California, headquartered in Santa Barbara.

In 1850, two years after the Mexican Cession, the Diocese of Alta and Baja California was split between the American and Mexican territories, and San Jose became a part of the Diocese of Monterey. In 1853, the northern half of the county became part of the Archdiocese of San Francisco, while the areas around Gilroy and Morgan Hill remained in the Diocese of Monterey. In 1922 the American Catholic Church decided to use county boundaries for dioceses, and the southern half of the county was transferred to the Archdiocese of San Francisco.

Pope John Paul II granted the See of San Jose independence on January 27, 1981; the diocese was canonically erected later that year by archbishops Pio Laghi, Apostolic Delegate to the United States, and John R. Quinn, Metropolitan Archbishop of San Francisco, on March 18, the vigil of the feast of Saint Joseph. The first Bishop of San Jose was Pierre DuMaine, and the first cathedral of the diocese was Saint Patrick Proto-Cathedral Parish.

The 1989 Loma Prieta earthquake damaged St. Joseph's Cathedral, resulting in the need for $22 million in repairs; it also damaged Saint Joseph's Seminary of Mountain View, resulting in the death of someone working in the tower.  St. Joseph's, a Sulpician seminary at one time affiliated with Saint Patrick Seminary, was subsequently closed and demolished, with the intent to sell part of the land to build luxury homes and use the proceeds to repay a $20 million loan used to repair the cathedral. As part of the deal with the Cupertino City Council,  were donated to the county park system, to be added to Rancho San Antonio County Park.

Reports of sex abuse

On October 18, 2018, the Diocese of San Jose released the names of 15 former priests who served the Diocese and were "credibly accused" of sexual abuse. It was also reported that the Diocese knew about the allegations against these priests and shielded them from potential prosecution. From May to December 2019, the Diocese of San Jose along with six five dioceses provided numerous documents to California State Attorney Xavier Becerra in preparation for a series of pending lawsuits which are expected to be filed after a new California law which will temporarily remove the statute of limitations goes into effect on January 1, 2020.

Bishops
The bishops who served in this diocese and their tenures of service:

Bishops of San José in California
 Pierre DuMaine (January 27, 1981 – November 27, 1999)
 Patrick Joseph McGrath (November 27, 1999 – May 1, 2019)
 Oscar Cantú (May 1, 2019–present)

Coadjutor Bishops
 Patrick Joseph McGrath (1998–1999)
 Oscar Cantú (2018–2019)

Auxiliary Bishop
Thomas A. Daly (May 25, 2011 – May 20, 2015), appointed Bishop of Spokane

Other priest of this diocese who became Bishop
 Richard John Garcia, appointed auxiliary bishop of Sacramento in 1997 and later appointed Bishop of Monterey in 2006

Education

In terms of student population, the diocese is the second largest education provider in the county, trailing only San Jose Unified School District. Most of the primary schools are parochial, or operated by a parish, while all the high schools are operated by either the diocese or by a religious institute. Santa Clara University is a Jesuit-run university at the site of Mission Santa Clara.

Primary schools
 
Canyon Heights Academy administrated by the Legionaries of Christ
Holy Family School (San Jose, CA)
Holy Spirit School (San Jose, CA)
Most Holy Trinity School
Queen of Apostles School
Sacred Heart Nativity School sponsored by the Society of Jesus
Sacred Heart School (Saratoga, California)
Saint Catherine of Alexandria School
Saint Christopher School (San Jose, CA)
Saint Clare School
Saint Elizabeth Seton School sponsored by the Daughters of Charity of Saint Vincent de Paul
Saint Frances Cabrini School
Saint John the Baptist School
Saint John Vianney School
Saint Joseph of Cupertino School
St. Joseph Catholic School (Mountain View, California)
Saint Justin School
Saint Lawrence Elementary and Middle School
Saint Leo the Great School (San Jose)
Saint Lucy School
Saint Martin of Tours School
Saint Mary of the Immaculate Conception School
Saint Mary School Gilroy
Saint Nicholas School
Saint Patrick School sponsored by the Daughters of Charity of Saint Vincent de Paul
Saint Simon School
Saint Victor School

High schools
Archbishop Mitty High School
Bellarmine College Preparatory
Cristo Rey San José Jesuit High School
Notre Dame High School
Presentation High School
Saint Francis High School

Closed Schools
Saint Lawrence Academy
Catholic Academy of Sunnyvale

Parishes

Alphabetical
Campbell (1)
Saint Lucy Parish

Cupertino (1)
Saint Joseph of Cupertino Parish

Gilroy (1)
Saint Mary Parish

Los Altos (2)
Saint Nicholas and Saint William Parish
Saint Simon Parish

Los Gatos (1)
Saint Mary of the Immaculate Conception Parish

Milpitas (2)
Saint Elizabeth Parish
Saint John the Baptist Parish

Morgan Hill (1)
Saint Catherine of Alexandria Parish

Mountain View (2)
Saint Athanasius Parish
Saint Joseph Parish

Palo Alto (1)
Saint Thomas Aquinas Parish

San Jose (30)
Cathedral Basilica of St. Joseph
Christ the King Parish
Church of the Transfiguration
Five Wounds Portuguese National Parish
Holy Cross Parish
Holy Family Parish
Holy Korean Martyrs Parish
Holy Spirit Parish
Most Holy Trinity Parish
Oratory of the Immaculate Heart of Mary
Our Lady of Guadalupe Parish
Our Lady of La Vang Parish (formerly Saint Patrick Proto-Cathedral Parish)
Our Lady of Refuge
Our Lady Star of the Sea Parish
Queen of Apostles Parish
Sacred Heart of Jesus Parish
Saint Anthony Parish
Saint Brother Albert Chmielowski Polish Mission
Saint Christopher Parish
Saint Frances Cabrini Parish
Saint Francis of Assisi Parish
Saint John Vianney Parish
Saint Julie Billiart Parish
Saint Leo the Great Parish
Saint Maria Goretti Parish
Saint Martin of Tours Parish
Saint Mary of the Assumption Croatian Mission
Saint Thomas of Canterbury Parish
Saint Victor Parish
Santa Teresa Parish

Santa Clara (6)
Chinese Catholic Mission
Mission Santa Clara (distinct from Saint Clare Parish, located across the street)
Our Lady of Peace Parish (sponsored by the Institute of the Incarnate Word)
Saint Clare Parish
Saint Justin Parish
Saint Lawrence the Martyr Parish

Saratoga (2)
Church of the Ascension
Sacred Heart Church

Stanford (1)
Catholic Community at Stanford

Sunnyvale (3)
Church of the Resurrection
Saint Cyprian Parish
Saint Martin Parish

Arms

Media
The diocese publishes a quarterly tri-lingual magazine, The Valley Catholic.

See also

 Catholic Church by country
 Catholic Church in the United States
 Ecclesiastical Province of San Francisco
 Global organisation of the Catholic Church
 List of Roman Catholic archdioceses (by country and continent)
 List of Roman Catholic dioceses (alphabetical) (including archdioceses)
 List of Roman Catholic dioceses (structured view) (including archdioceses)
 List of the Catholic dioceses of the United States

References

Specific references:

General references:

External links

Parishes in Diocese of San Jose in California

 
Culture of San Jose, California
San Jose In California
San Jose
San Jose in California
Santa Clara County, California
1981 establishments in California